Tang-e Katuiyeh (also Romanized as Tang-e Katū’īyeh) is a village in Balesh Rural District, in the Central District of Darab County, Fars Province, Iran. At the 2006 census, its population was 1,848, in 423 families.

References 

Populated places in Darab County